Cleisostoma paniculatum is a species of orchid found in India, Assam, Bhutan, Taiwan, Thailand, Vietnam, and China (Fujian, Guangdong, Guangxi, Hainan, Jiangxi, Sichuan, Tibet).

References

External links 

paniculatum
Orchids of Taiwan